Sierpnica  is a village in the administrative district of Gmina Głuszyca, within Wałbrzych County, Lower Silesian Voivodeship, in south-western Poland, close to the Czech border. 

The village has a population of 180.

References

Villages in Wałbrzych County